Plaxiphora is a genus of chitons in the family Mopaliidae.

Species
 Plaxiphora albida (Blainville, 1825)
 Plaxiphora atlantica 
 Plaxiphora aurata (Spalowsky 1795)
 Plaxiphora aurea 
 Plaxiphora australis Suter, 1907
 Plaxiphora bednalli 
 Plaxiphora biramosa Quoy & Gaimard, 1835
 Plaxiphora boydeni Murdoch, 1982
 Plaxiphora brevispinosa 
 Plaxiphora caelata Reeve, 1847
 Plaxiphora costata (Blainville)
 Plaxiphora dardennei 
 Plaxiphora egregia H. Adams, 1866
 Plaxiphora fernandezi 
 Plaxiphora frigida 
 Plaxiphora glauca 
 Plaxiphora kamehamehae
 Plaxiphora marquesana
 Plaxiphora matthewsi 
 Plaxiphora mercatoris Leloup, 1936 
 Plaxiphora mixta 
 Plaxiphora murdochi Suter, 1905
 Plaxiphora obscurella 
 Plaxiphora obtecta Carpenter in Pilsbry, 1893
 Plaxiphora paeteliana 
 Plaxiphora petholata 
 Plaxiphora petholatus
 Plaxiphora reoplendens 
 Plaxiphora schauinslandi 
 Plaxiphora setiger
 Plaxiphora setigera 
 Plaxiphora tricolor
 Plaxiphora tulearensis

References
 Royal Society of New Zealand
 Te Papa
 Inreach
 Discover Life
 ZipCodeZoo
 Powell A. W. B., New Zealand Mollusca, William Collins Publishers Ltd, Auckland, New Zealand 1979 

Mopaliidae
Taxa described in 1847
Chiton genera